Albert Ronald Tremain (9 October 1923 – 17 July 1998) was a New Zealand composer and music teacher.

Biography
Born in Feilding, New Zealand in 1923, Tremain initially studied piano, gaining Trinity College diplomas before graduating with his first degree in music from Canterbury University College in 1946.

After war service he taught at Feilding High School and attended Cambridge Summer Music Schools (studying composition with Douglas Lilburn) in 1947 and 1948. He continued his studies at the Royal College of Music in London, gaining diplomas in piano performance and a doctorate in 1953.

Awards during this time included the Royal College of Music Cobbett Prize for string quartet, the Farrar Prize for composition, and 2nd Prize in the Lionel Tertis Awards. In 1952 he was awarded an Italian Government Bursary and studied composition with Goffredo Petrassi at the Conservatorio Santa Cecilia in Rome.

In 1957 he married Margaret Anne Severs, and later had four children; Sally, Gillian, Mary and William.

After some years working free-lance in London as a teacher, composer, and examiner he returned to New Zealand, where he spent ten years as a lecturer at the University of Auckland. In 1963 he was awarded the Carnegie Travelling Fellowship and toured universities in the United States. From 1967 to 1968 he was Visiting Professor at the School of Music, University of Michigan, Ann Arbor, and from 1968 to 1969 Visiting Professor of Theory and Composition at the State University of New York, Buffalo. He then returned to Britain to lecture at Goldsmiths College at the University of London.

In 1970 he moved to Canada where, until his retirement in 1989, he was Professor of Music at Brock University. He was made a Professor Emeritus in 1991. Tremain died at Niagara on the Lake, Ontario in 1998.

Notable students include John Rimmer.

Selected works 
Allegro for Strings
Five Epigrams for Twelve Solo Strings for string ensemble of any size
Four Medieval Lyrics for mezzo-soprano and string trio
Magnificat and Nunc dimittis for soprano solo and mixed choir
Mass for mixed voices and organ
Music for Violin and Strings for solo violin and string orchestra
Nine Studies for violin and viola (1960)
Psalm 100 for unaccompanied choir
Seven Medieval Lyrics for solo tenor, mixed choir and orchestra
Tenera Juventa for mixed choir and 2 pianos
Three Inventions for piano
Three Poems of James Joyce for baritone and viola (1975, revised 1990)
Three Songs for soprano and viola (1960)

References 

 Content adapted from: http://sounz.org.nz/contributor/composer/1093

External links 
 Ronald Tremain at the Centre for New Zealand Music

1923 births
1998 deaths
New Zealand composers
Male composers
Academic staff of the University of Auckland
University of Canterbury alumni
20th-century composers
20th-century New Zealand musicians
Alumni of the Royal College of Music
20th-century male musicians
People from Feilding
New Zealand expatriates in the United Kingdom